Trotamundos B.B.C., also known as Trotamundos de Carabobo, is a professional basketball team based in Valencia, located in the Venezuelan Carabobo State. The team currently plays in the Venezuelan SuperLiga. The team has won the Venezuelan championship 11 times. Trotamundos has also won the South American club championship three times, in 1988, 1989 and 2000.

History
On June 11, 1983, Germán Blanco Romero bought the Andinos de Mérida team and named the team Trotamundos (in English: Globetrotters) in honour to the Harlem Globetrotters team. In 1986, the team managed to win its first national title after an impressive season with a 26–10 record.

Trophies
Venezuelan Championship
Winners (10): 1986, 1987, 1988, 1989, 1994, 1999, 2002, 2006, 2019, 2021
South American Club Championship
Winners (3): 1988, 1989, 2000

Notable players

  David Cubillán

References

External links
Official Website
Team Profile at Latinbasket.com

Basketball teams established in 1984
Basketball teams in Venezuela
Carabobo